Karen Morgan is a politician from Utah.

Karen Morgan may also refer to:

Karen Morgan, character in Bitten (TV series)
Karen Morgan, character in Mr. Morgan's Last Love